U Minh is a rural district (huyện) of Cà Mau province in the Mekong Delta region of Vietnam. As of 2003, the district had a population of 91,438. The district capital lies at U Minh.

It is located on Vietnam's western coast on the Cà Mau Peninsula, abutting the Gulf of Thailand. It is bordered by the districts of U Minh Thượng district to the north in Kiên Giang province, Trần Văn Thời to the south and Thới Bình to the east.

The terrain is mostly flat, salty floodplains.

Divisions
The district is subdivided into 8 commune-level subdivisions, including the township of U Minh and the rural communes of Nguyễn Phích, Khánh Hội, Khánh Hòa, Khánh Tiến, Khánh Thuận, Khánh Lâm and Khánh An.

References

Districts of Cà Mau province